Kenneth F. Arkell (born December 6, 1930) is a retired judge and former Canadian football player who played for the Ottawa Rough Riders and BC Lions. He played college football at the University of Western Ontario. He was a justice of the Supreme Court of British Columbia from 1990 to 1999. He was a member of the Royal Canadian Mounted Police, a Crown Prosecutor and was the Deputy Chief Judge of the British Columbia Provincial Court during which time he authored the British Columbia Provincial Court Act of 1975. Justice Arkell served for 30 years as judge in the Province of British Columbia.

References

1930 births
Living people
BC Lions players
Western Mustangs football players
Canadian football people from Calgary
Players of Canadian football from Alberta